Otar Megvinetukhutsesi (16 January 1932, Tbilisi – 9 May 2013, Tbilisi) was a Georgian film and theatre actor. Honored Artist of the Georgian SSR (1964), People's Artist of the Georgian SSR (1973), People's Artist of the USSR (1979), Commander of the Order of Honour (2000). Winner of the Tokyo International Film Festival (1991) and the Georgian State Prize (1981, 2001). He graduated from the Shota Rustaveli Theater Institute in 1954. He played more than 35 roles during his career including a memorable role in the 1978 film Data Tutashkhia. Megvinetukhutsesi was married to the Georgian actress Guranda Gabunia (1938–2019). He died at the age of 81 in Tbilisi in 2013. He was buried at the Didube Pantheon in Tbilisi. The monument of the Otar Megvinetukhutsesi was opened in the "April 9 Square" in Tbilisi, in 2015.

Filmography 
 Fatima (ფატიმა, 1958) as Jambulati
 good people (კეთილი ადამიანები, 1961) as Giga
 Under One Sky (ერთი ცის ქვეშ, 1961) as Bondo
 Who will saddle the horse (ვინ შეკაზმავს ცხენს, 1965) as Gvadi
 The Plea (ვედრება, 1967) as Jokola
 Tariel Golua (ტარიელ გოლუა, 1968) as Gaiozi
 The Right Hand of the Grand Master (დიდოსტატის მარჯვენა, 1970) as King Giorgi
 Tsotne Dadiani (ცოტნე დადიანი, 1971) as Tsotne Dadiani
 A Necklace for My Beloved (სამკაული ჩემი სატრფოსათვის, 1971) as Magomedi
 Goodbye, Inesa! (მშვიდობით, ინესა!, 1972) as Alonso
 Seekers of the sunk city (ჩაძირული ქალაქის მაძიებლები, 1972) as Man with the glasses
 Kidnapping the Moon (მთვარის მოტაცება, 1973) as Arzakan Zvambai
 Autumn Sun (მზე შემოდგომისა, 1973) as Vakhtangi
 The Wishing Tree (ნატვრის ხე, 1976) as Elioz
 Data Tutashkhia (დათა თუთაშხია, 1978) as Data Tutashkhia
 Hello Everyone (გამარჯობა ყველას, 1980) as Nikala
 Way Back Home (გზა შინისაკენ, 1981)
 Brother (ძმა, 1981) as Paghava
 Khareba and Gogia (ხარება და გოგია, 1987) as Akhvlediani
 Turandot (ტურანდოტი, 1989) as Khozrevani
 White flags (თეთრი ბაირაღები, 1990) as Isidore
 Spiral (სპირალი, 1990) as David Giorgadze
 Get Thee Out (Изыди!, 1991) as Motya Rabinovich
 Iavnana (იავნანა, 1994) as mullah
 Past Shadows (წარსულის აჩრდილები, 1996) as Qaikhosro

References

External links 

 Otar Megvinetukhutsesi at Great Russian Encyclopedia

1932 births
2013 deaths
Male film actors from Georgia (country)
Actors from Tbilisi
People's Artists of Georgia
Soviet male film actors
Film people from Tbilisi
People's Artists of the USSR
Rustaveli Prize winners
Recipients of the Order of Honor (Georgia)
Burials at Didube Pantheon